Thelma Boughner (27 September 1918 – 29 October 2017) was a Canadian diver who competed in the 1936 Summer Olympics. She was born in Toronto, Ontario in September 1918 and died in October 2017 at the age of 99.

References

1918 births
2017 deaths
Canadian female divers
Divers at the 1936 Summer Olympics
Divers from Toronto
Olympic divers of Canada
20th-century Canadian women